Eric Iglesias (born April 5, 1981, in Panama City, Panama) is a Panamanian director and writer who resides in Los Angeles

Education
Iglesias obtained his bachelor's degree in Electronic Engineering at the Universidad Católica Santa María La Antigua in Panama City, Panama.  He later went to receive an M.F.A. in Filmmaking from the New York Film Academy in Universal Studios, CA.

Films
Iglesias wrote and directed "Lucy", a highly acclaimed short film that participated in numerous film festivals, and deals with the immigration issues that the DREAM Act attempts to solve. The film was selected for the Short Film Corner in the 66th edition of the Cannes International Film Festival.  He was the first Panamanian ever to present material the festival.

His latest collaboration is with the Belarusian producer Kseniya Yorsh, on a film that explores the topic of religion by telling the story of a young girl who is faced with making tough decisions while not abandoning her faith.

References

1981 births
Living people
Panamanian emigrants to the United States
New York Film Academy alumni